The Saddle Hawk is a lost 1925 American silent Western film directed by Edward Sedgwick and starring Hoot Gibson. It was produced and distributed by Universal Pictures.

Plot
As described in a film magazine, Ben Johnson (Gibson), a despised sheepherder, works for an old Mexican, but is unhappy because he loves cattle and wants to be a cowboy. Riding to town one day, he sees a Rena (Nixon) and asks for a drink which she refuses to give him because she is a cattleman’s daughter with cattle owners’ prejudices. The next day several men go looking for this young woman from her father’s ranch. They visit Ben’s employer while Ben is away. When Ben returns, his boss gives him a beautiful golden mare, hat, and other necessities to bedeck him for real riding. Then he tells Ben to visit the very young woman who had slighted him the prior day, and take her to her father. As Ben arrives, a neighboring bad man is wooing her over-strenuously. Ben knocks him out, and drives him off. Rena agrees to go with Ben. The next morning, camping near a stream, Ben is shot at, but gets his attacker, the bad man. Being pursued, they separate and she is found by the first two who originally wanted her. Ben joins up with Buck Brent (Campeau), a bad man who hates the young woman’s father, Jim Newhall (French), because he had once sent him to jail. Ben follows the trail and arrives at Brent’s place, defying death at every turn. They accept him after putting him to a rigorous test. On a cattle raid to get Newhall’s steers, Ben falls and is captured. Once before Newhall, he communicates some interesting information. Immediately, Newhall organizes a raid. Ben rescues Rena and Brent is shot.

Cast

See also
 Hoot Gibson filmography

References

External links
 

1925 films
Lost Western (genre) films
Universal Pictures films
1925 Western (genre) films
Films directed by Edward Sedgwick
Lost American films
American black-and-white films
1925 lost films
Silent American Western (genre) films
1920s American films